The 1956 Chester-le-Street by-election was a parliamentary by-election held for the British House of Commons constituency of Chester-le-Street on 27 September 1956.

Vacancy
The by-election had been caused by the death aged 47 years on 25 June 1956 of the sitting Labour Member of Parliament (MP) Patrick Bartley. Bartley had held the seat since 1950.

Candidates
In what was to be a straight fight between the two main parties, Labour chose Norman Pentland, a colliery checkweighman from Fatfield, County Durham as their candidate and the Conservatives selected the journalist William Rees-Mogg.

Issues
The main political topic of the day was the Suez Crisis but the cost of living and the performance of the government on the economy were also mentioned by Labour as issues in the campaign.

The result
In what was a safe Labour seat during a period of Conservative government Pentland was easily elected with a majority of 21,287 votes.

The votes

References

See also
 List of United Kingdom by-elections
 United Kingdom by-election records

1956 elections in the United Kingdom
1956 in England
September 1956 events in the United Kingdom
20th century in County Durham
1956